Ahmed Bouden (born 4 December 1938) is an Algerian footballer. He played in six matches for the Algeria national football team from 1964 to 1968. He was also named in Algeria's squad for the 1968 African Cup of Nations tournament.

References

External links
 

1938 births
Living people
Algerian footballers
Algeria international footballers
1968 African Cup of Nations players
Association football defenders
People from Annaba
21st-century Algerian people